Nova Zagora Municipality is a municipality in the Sliven Province of Bulgaria.

Demography

At the 2011 census, the population of Nova Zagora was 39,010. Most of the inhabitants were Bulgarians (70.65%) with a minority of Turks (14.08%) and Gypsies/Romani (3.67%). 11.18% of the population's ethnicity was unknown.

Villages
In addition to the capital town of Nova Zagora, there are 32 villages in the municipality:

References

Municipalities in Sliven Province